This is a list of the bird species recorded in Bosnia-Herzegovina. The avifauna of Bosnia-Herzegovina include a total of 346 species.

This list's taxonomic treatment (designation and sequence of orders, families and species) and nomenclature (common and scientific names) follow the conventions of The Clements Checklist of Birds of the World, 2022 edition. The family accounts at the beginning of each heading reflect this taxonomy, as do the species counts found in each family account. Accidental species are included in the total species count for Bosnia-Herzegovina.

The following tags highlight several categories of occurrence other than regular migrants and residents. The commonly occurring native species are untagged.

 (A) Accidental - a species that rarely or accidentally occurs in Bosnia-Herzegovina
 (I) Introduced - a species introduced to Bosnia-Herzegovina as a consequence, direct or indirect, of human actions

Ducks, geese, and waterfowl
Order: AnseriformesFamily: Anatidae

Anatidae includes the ducks and most duck-like waterfowl, such as geese and swans. These birds are adapted to an aquatic existence with webbed feet, flattened bills, and feathers that are excellent at shedding water due to an oily coating.

Graylag goose, Anser anser
Greater white-fronted goose, Anser albifrons
Lesser white-fronted goose, Anser erythropus
Taiga bean-goose, Anser fabalis
Pink-footed goose, Anser brachyrhynchus (A)
Red-breasted goose, Branta ruficollis
Mute swan, Cygnus olor
Black swan, Cygnus olor (I)
Whooper swan, Cygnus cygnus
Ruddy shelduck, Tadorna ferruginea
Common shelduck, Tadorna tadorna
Mandarin duck, Aix galericulata (I)
Garganey, Spatula querquedula
Northern shoveler, Spatula clypeata
Gadwall, Mareca strepera
Eurasian wigeon, Mareca penelope
Mallard, Anas platyrhynchos
Northern pintail, Anas acuta
Green-winged teal, Anas crecca
Marbled teal, Marmaronetta angustirostris
Red-crested pochard, Netta rufina
Common pochard, Aythya ferina
Ferruginous duck, Aythya nyroca
Tufted duck, Aythya fuligula
Greater scaup, Aythya marila
Common eider, Somateria mollissima
Velvet scoter, Melanitta fusca
Common scoter, Melanitta nigra
Long-tailed duck, Clangula hyemalis
Common goldeneye, Bucephala clangula
Smew, Mergellus albellus
Common merganser, Mergus merganser
Red-breasted merganser, Mergus serrator
White-headed duck, Oxyura leucocephala

Pheasants, grouse, and allies
Order: GalliformesFamily: Phasianidae

The Phasianidae are a family of terrestrial birds. In general, they are plump (although they vary in size) and have broad, relatively short wings.

Common quail, Coturnix coturnix
Rock partridge, Alectoris graeca
Ring-necked pheasant, Phasianus colchicus (I)
Gray partridge, Perdix perdix
Western capercaillie, Tetrao urogallus
Black grouse, Lyrurus tetrix
Hazel grouse, Tetrastes bonasia

Flamingos
Order: PhoenicopteriformesFamily: Phoenicopteridae

Flamingos filter-feed on shellfish and algae. Their oddly shaped beaks are specially adapted to separate mud and silt from the food they consume and, uniquely, are used upside-down.

Greater flamingo, Phoenicopterus roseus

Grebes
Order: PodicipediformesFamily: Podicipedidae

Grebes are small to medium-large freshwater diving birds. They have lobed toes and are excellent swimmers and divers. However, they have their feet placed far back on the body, making them quite ungainly on land.

Little grebe, Tachybaptus ruficollis
Horned grebe, Podiceps auritus
Red-necked grebe, Podiceps grisegena
Great crested grebe, Podiceps cristatus
Eared grebe, Podiceps nigricollis

Pigeons and doves
Order: ColumbiformesFamily: Columbidae

Pigeons and doves are stout-bodied birds with short necks and short slender bills with a fleshy cere. 

Rock pigeon, Columba livia
Stock dove, Columba oenas
Common wood-pigeon, Columba palumbus
European turtle-dove, Streptopelia turtur
Eurasian collared-dove, Streptopelia decaocto

Sandgrouse
Order: PterocliformesFamily: Pteroclidae

Sandgrouse have small, pigeon like heads and necks, but sturdy compact bodies. They have long pointed wings and sometimes tails and a fast direct flight. Flocks fly to watering holes at dawn and dusk. Their legs are feathered down to the toes. 

Pallas's sandgrouse, Syrrhaptes paradoxus

Bustards
Order: OtidiformesFamily: Otididae

Bustards are large terrestrial birds mainly associated with dry open country and steppes in the Old World. They are omnivorous and nest on the ground. They walk steadily on strong legs and big toes, pecking for food as they go. They have long broad wings with "fingered" wingtips and striking patterns in flight. Many have interesting mating displays.

Great bustard, Otis tarda
Little bustard, Tetrax tetrax

Cuckoos
Order: CuculiformesFamily: Cuculidae

The family Cuculidae includes cuckoos, roadrunners and anis. These birds are of variable size with slender bodies, long tails and strong legs. 

Great spotted cuckoo, Clamator glandarius
Common cuckoo, Cuculus canorus

Nightjars and allies
Order: CaprimulgiformesFamily: Caprimulgidae

Nightjars are medium-sized nocturnal birds that usually nest on the ground. They have long wings, short legs and very short bills. Most have small feet, of little use for walking, and long pointed wings. Their soft plumage is camouflaged to resemble bark or leaves.

Eurasian nightjar, Caprimulgus europaeus

Swifts
Order: CaprimulgiformesFamily: Apodidae

Swifts are small birds which spend the majority of their lives flying. These birds have very short legs and never settle voluntarily on the ground, perching instead only on vertical surfaces. Many swifts have long swept-back wings which resemble a crescent or boomerang.

Alpine swift, Apus melba
Common swift, Apus apus
Pallid swift, Apus pallidus

Rails, gallinules, and coots
Order: GruiformesFamily: Rallidae

Rallidae is a large family of small to medium-sized birds which includes the rails, crakes, coots and gallinules. Typically they inhabit dense vegetation in damp environments near lakes, swamps or rivers. In general they are shy and secretive birds, making them difficult to observe. Most species have strong legs and long toes which are well adapted to soft uneven surfaces. They tend to have short, rounded wings and to be weak fliers.

Water rail, Rallus aquaticus
Corn crake, Crex crex
Spotted crake, Porzana porzana
Eurasian moorhen, Gallinula chloropus
Eurasian coot, Fulica atra
Little crake, Zapornia parva
Baillon's crake, Zapornia pusilla

Cranes
Order: GruiformesFamily: Gruidae

Cranes are large, long-legged and long-necked birds. Unlike the similar-looking but unrelated herons, cranes fly with necks outstretched, not pulled back. Most have elaborate and noisy courting displays or "dances". 

Common crane, Grus grus

Thick-knees
Order: CharadriiformesFamily: Burhinidae

The thick-knees are a group of largely tropical waders in the family Burhinidae. They are found worldwide within the tropical zone, with some species also breeding in temperate Europe and Australia. They are medium to large waders with strong black or yellow-black bills, large yellow eyes and cryptic plumage. Despite being classed as waders, most species have a preference for arid or semi-arid habitats.

Eurasian thick-knee, Burhinus oedicnemus

Stilts and avocets
Order: CharadriiformesFamily: Recurvirostridae

Recurvirostridae is a family of large wading birds, which includes the avocets and stilts. The avocets have long legs and long up-curved bills. The stilts have extremely long legs and long, thin, straight bills. 

Black-winged stilt, Himantopus himantopus
Pied avocet, Recurvirostra avosetta

Oystercatchers
Order: CharadriiformesFamily: Haematopodidae

The oystercatchers are large and noisy plover-like birds, with strong bills used for smashing or prising open molluscs. 

Eurasian oystercatcher, Haematopus ostralegus

Plovers and lapwings
Order: CharadriiformesFamily: Charadriidae

The family Charadriidae includes the plovers, dotterels and lapwings. They are small to medium-sized birds with compact bodies, short, thick necks and long, usually pointed, wings. They are found in open country worldwide, mostly in habitats near water.

Black-bellied plover, Pluvialis squatarola
European golden-plover, Pluvialis apricaria
Northern lapwing, Vanellus vanellus
Kentish plover, Charadrius alexandrinus
Common ringed plover, Charadrius hiaticula
Little ringed plover, Charadrius dubius
Eurasian dotterel, Charadrius morinellus

Sandpipers and allies
Order: CharadriiformesFamily: Scolopacidae

Scolopacidae is a large diverse family of small to medium-sized shorebirds including the sandpipers, curlews, godwits, shanks, tattlers, woodcocks, snipes, dowitchers and phalaropes. The majority of these species eat small invertebrates picked out of the mud or soil. Variation in length of legs and bills enables multiple species to feed in the same habitat, particularly on the coast, without direct competition for food. 

Whimbrel, Numenius phaeopus
Slender-billed curlew, Numenius tenuirostris (A)
Eurasian curlew, Numenius arquata
Bar-tailed godwit, Limosa lapponica
Black-tailed godwit, Limosa limosa
Ruddy turnstone, Arenaria interpres
Ruff, Calidris pugnax
Curlew sandpiper, Calidris ferruginea
Temminck's stint, Calidris temminckii
Sanderling, Calidris alba
Dunlin, Calidris alpina
Little stint, Calidris minuta
Jack snipe, Lymnocryptes minimus
Eurasian woodcock, Scolopax rusticola
Great snipe, Gallinago media
Common snipe, Gallinago gallinago
Red phalarope, Phalaropus fulicarius
Common sandpiper, Actitis hypoleucos
Green sandpiper, Tringa ochropus
Spotted redshank, Tringa erythropus
Common greenshank, Tringa nebularia
Marsh sandpiper, Tringa stagnatilis
Wood sandpiper, Tringa glareola
Common redshank, Tringa totanus

Pratincoles and coursers
Order: CharadriiformesFamily: Glareolidae

Glareolidae is a family of wading birds comprising the pratincoles, which have short legs, long pointed wings and long forked tails, and the coursers, which have long legs, short wings and long, pointed bills which curve downwards. 

Collared pratincole, Glareola pratincola

Skuas and jaegers
Order: CharadriiformesFamily: Stercorariidae

The family Stercorariidae are, in general, medium to large birds, typically with grey or brown plumage, often with white markings on the wings. They nest on the ground in temperate and arctic regions and are long-distance migrants.

Pomarine jaeger, Stercorarius pomarinus
Parasitic jaeger, Stercorarius parasiticus
Long-tailed jaeger, Stercorarius longicaudus

Gulls, terns, and skimmers
Order: CharadriiformesFamily: Laridae

Laridae is a family of medium to large seabirds, the gulls, terns, and skimmers. Gulls are typically grey or white, often with black markings on the head or wings. They have stout, longish bills and webbed feet. Terns are a group of generally medium to large seabirds typically with grey or white plumage, often with black markings on the head. Most terns hunt fish by diving but some pick insects off the surface of fresh water. Terns are generally long-lived birds, with several species known to live in excess of 30 years.

Black-legged kittiwake, Rissa tridactyla (A)
Black-headed gull, Chroicocephalus ridibundus
Little gull, Hydrocoloeus minutus
Mediterranean gull, Ichthyaetus melanocephalus
Audouin's gull, Ichthyaetus audouinii
Common gull, Larus canus
Yellow-legged gull, Larus michahellis
Caspian gull, Larus cachinnans
Lesser black-backed gull, Larus fuscus
Great black-backed gull, Larus marinus
Little tern, Sternula albifrons
Gull-billed tern, Gelochelidon nilotica
Caspian tern, Hydroprogne caspia
Black tern, Chlidonias niger
White-winged tern, Chlidonias leucopterus
Whiskered tern, Chlidonias hybrida
Common tern, Sterna hirundo
Sandwich tern, Thalasseus sandvicensis

Loons
Order: GaviiformesFamily: Gaviidae

Loons, known as divers in Europe, are a group of aquatic birds found in many parts of North America and northern Europe. They are the size of a large duck or small goose, which they somewhat resemble when swimming, but to which they are completely unrelated. 

Red-throated loon, Gavia stellata
Arctic loon, Gavia arctica
Common loon, Gavia immer

Storks
Order: CiconiiformesFamily: Ciconiidae

Storks are large, long-legged, long-necked, wading birds with long, stout bills. Storks are mute, but bill-clattering is an important mode of communication at the nest. Their nests can be large and may be reused for many years. Many species are migratory.

Black stork, Ciconia nigra
White stork, Ciconia ciconia'

Cormorants and shags
Order: SuliformesFamily: Phalacrocoracidae

Phalacrocoracidae is a family of medium to large coastal, fish-eating seabirds that includes cormorants and shags. Plumage colouration varies, with the majority having mainly dark plumage, some species being black-and-white and a few being colourful.

Pygmy cormorant, Microcarbo pygmeusGreat cormorant, Phalacrocorax carboEuropean shag, Gulosus aristotelisPelicans
Order: PelecaniformesFamily: Pelecanidae

Pelicans are large water birds with a distinctive pouch under their beak. As with other members of the order Pelecaniformes, they have webbed feet with four toes.

Great white pelican, Pelecanus onocrotalusDalmatian pelican, Pelecanus crispus (extirpated)

Herons, egrets, and bitterns
Order: PelecaniformesFamily: Ardeidae

The family Ardeidae contains the bitterns, herons, and egrets. Herons and egrets are medium to large wading birds with long necks and legs. Bitterns tend to be shorter necked and more wary. Members of Ardeidae fly with their necks retracted, unlike other long-necked birds such as storks, ibises and spoonbills.

Great bittern, Botaurus stellarisLittle bittern, Ixobrychus minutusGray heron, Ardea cinereaPurple heron, Ardea purpureaGreat egret, Ardea albaLittle egret, Egretta garzettaCattle egret, Bubulcus ibisSquacco heron, Ardeola ralloidesBlack-crowned night-heron, Nycticorax nycticoraxIbises and spoonbills
Order: PelecaniformesFamily: Threskiornithidae

Threskiornithidae is a family of large terrestrial and wading birds which includes the ibises and spoonbills. They have long, broad wings with 11 primary and about 20 secondary feathers. They are strong fliers and despite their size and weight, very capable soarers.

Glossy ibis, Plegadis falcinellusEurasian spoonbill, Platalea leucorodiaOsprey
Order: AccipitriformesFamily: Pandionidae

The family Pandionidae contains only one species, the osprey. The osprey is a medium-large raptor which is a specialist fish-eater with a worldwide distribution.

Osprey, Pandion haliaetusHawks, eagles, and kites
Order: AccipitriformesFamily: Accipitridae

Accipitridae is a family of birds of prey, which includes hawks, eagles, kites, harriers and Old World vultures. These birds have powerful hooked beaks for tearing flesh from their prey, strong legs, powerful talons and keen eyesight.

Bearded vulture, Gypaetus barbatus (extirpated)
Egyptian vulture, Neophron percnopterusEuropean honey-buzzard, Pernis apivorusCinereous vulture, Aegypius monachusEurasian griffon, Gyps fulvusShort-toed snake-eagle, Circaetus gallicusLesser spotted eagle, Clanga pomarinaGreater spotted eagle, Clanga clangaBooted eagle, Hieraaetus pennatusImperial eagle, Aquila heliacaGolden eagle, Aquila chrysaetosBonelli's eagle, Aquila fasciataEurasian marsh-harrier, Circus aeruginosusHen harrier, Circus cyaneusPallid harrier, Circus macrourusMontagu's harrier, Circus pygargusLevant sparrowhawk, Accipiter brevipesEurasian sparrowhawk, Accipiter nisusNorthern goshawk, Accipiter gentilisRed kite, Milvus milvusBlack kite, Milvus migransWhite-tailed eagle, Haliaeetus albicillaRough-legged hawk, Buteo lagopusCommon buzzard, Buteo buteoLong-legged buzzard, Buteo rufinusBarn-owls
Order: StrigiformesFamily: Tytonidae

Barn-owls are medium to large owls with large heads and characteristic heart-shaped faces. They have long strong legs with powerful talons. 

Barn owl, Tyto albaOwls
Order: StrigiformesFamily: Strigidae

The typical owls are small to large solitary nocturnal birds of prey. They have large forward-facing eyes and ears, a hawk-like beak and a conspicuous circle of feathers around each eye called a facial disk.

Eurasian scops-owl, Otus scopsEurasian eagle-owl, Bubo buboNorthern hawk owl, Surnia ululaEurasian pygmy-owl, Glaucidium passerinumLittle owl, Athene noctuaTawny owl, Strix alucoUral owl, Strix uralensisLong-eared owl, Asio otusShort-eared owl, Asio flammeusBoreal owl, Aegolius funereusHoopoes
Order: BucerotiformesFamily: Upupidae

Hoopoes have black, white and orangey-pink colouring with a large erectile crest on their head. 

Eurasian hoopoe, Upupa epopsKingfishers
Order: CoraciiformesFamily: Alcedinidae

Kingfishers are medium-sized birds with large heads, long, pointed bills, short legs and stubby tails.

Common kingfisher, Alcedo atthisBee-eaters
Order: CoraciiformesFamily: Meropidae

The bee-eaters are a group of near passerine birds in the family Meropidae. Most species are found in Africa but others occur in southern Europe, Madagascar, Australia and New Guinea. They are characterised by richly coloured plumage, slender bodies and usually elongated central tail feathers. All are colourful and have long downturned bills and pointed wings, which give them a swallow-like appearance when seen from afar.

European bee-eater, Merops apiasterRollers
Order: CoraciiformesFamily: Coraciidae

Rollers resemble crows in size and build, but are more closely related to the kingfishers and bee-eaters. They share the colourful appearance of those groups with blues and browns predominating. The two inner front toes are connected, but the outer toe is not.

European roller, Coracias garrulusWoodpeckers
Order: PiciformesFamily: Picidae

Woodpeckers are small to medium-sized birds with chisel-like beaks, short legs, stiff tails and long tongues used for capturing insects. Some species have feet with two toes pointing forward and two backward, while several species have only three toes. Many woodpeckers have the habit of tapping noisily on tree trunks with their beaks.

Eurasian wryneck, Jynx torquillaEurasian three-toed woodpecker, Picoides tridactylusMiddle spotted woodpecker, Dendrocoptes mediusWhite-backed woodpecker, Dendrocopos leucotosGreat spotted woodpecker, Dendrocopos majorSyrian woodpecker, Dendrocopos syriacusLesser spotted woodpecker, Dryobates minorGray-headed woodpecker, Picus canusEurasian green woodpecker, Picus viridisBlack woodpecker, Dryocopus martiusFalcons and caracaras
Order: FalconiformesFamily: Falconidae

Falconidae is a family of diurnal birds of prey. They differ from hawks, eagles and kites in that they kill with their beaks instead of their talons.

Lesser kestrel, Falco naumanniEurasian kestrel, Falco tinnunculusRed-footed falcon, Falco vespertinusEleonora's falcon, Falco eleonorae (A)
Merlin, Falco columbariusEurasian hobby, Falco subbuteoLanner falcon, Falco biarmicusSaker falcon, Falco cherrugPeregrine falcon, Falco peregrinusOld World orioles
Order: PasseriformesFamily: Oriolidae

The Old World orioles are colourful passerine birds. They are not related to the New World orioles. 

Eurasian golden oriole, Oriolus oriolusShrikes
Order: PasseriformesFamily: Laniidae

Shrikes are passerine birds known for their habit of catching other birds and small animals and impaling the uneaten portions of their bodies on thorns. A typical shrike's beak is hooked, like a bird of prey.

Red-backed shrike, Lanius collurioGreat gray shrike, Lanius excubitorLesser gray shrike, Lanius minorWoodchat shrike, Lanius senatorCrows, jays, and magpies
Order: PasseriformesFamily: Corvidae

The family Corvidae includes crows, ravens, jays, choughs, magpies, treepies, nutcrackers and ground jays. Corvids are above average in size among the Passeriformes, and some of the larger species show high levels of intelligence. 

Eurasian jay, Garrulus glandariusEurasian magpie, Pica picaEurasian nutcracker, Nucifraga caryocatactesYellow-billed chough, Pyrrhocorax graculusEurasian jackdaw, Corvus monedulaRook, Corvus frugilegusCarrion crow, Corvus coroneHooded crow Corvus cornixCommon raven, Corvus coraxTits, chickadees, and titmice
Order: PasseriformesFamily: Paridae

The Paridae are mainly small stocky woodland species with short stout bills. Some have crests. They are adaptable birds, with a mixed diet including seeds and insects. 

Coal tit, Periparus aterCrested tit, Lophophanes cristatusSombre tit, Poecile lugubrisMarsh tit, Poecile palustrisWillow tit, Poecile montanaEurasian blue tit, Cyanistes caeruleusGreat tit, Parus majorPenduline-tits
Order: PasseriformesFamily: Remizidae

The penduline-tits are a group of small passerine birds related to the true tits. They are insectivores. 

Eurasian penduline-tit, Remiz pendulinusLarks
Order: PasseriformesFamily: Alaudidae

Larks are small terrestrial birds with often extravagant songs and display flights. Most larks are fairly dull in appearance. Their food is insects and seeds. 

Horned lark, Eremophila alpestrisGreater short-toed lark, Calandrella brachydactylaCalandra lark, Melanocorypha calandraWood lark, Lullula arboreaEurasian skylark, Alauda arvensisCrested lark, Galerida cristataBearded reedling
Order: PasseriformesFamily: Panuridae

This species, the only one in its family, is found in reed beds throughout temperate Europe and Asia.

Bearded reedling, Panurus biarmicusCisticolas and allies
Order: PasseriformesFamily: Cisticolidae

The Cisticolidae are warblers found mainly in warmer southern regions of the Old World. They are generally very small birds of drab brown or grey appearance found in open country such as grassland or scrub.

Zitting cisticola, Cisticola juncidisReed warblers and allies
Order: PasseriformesFamily: Acrocephalidae

The members of this family are usually rather large for "warblers". Most are rather plain olivaceous brown above with much yellow to beige below. They are usually found in open woodland, reedbeds, or tall grass. The family occurs mostly in southern to western Eurasia and surroundings, but it also ranges far into the Pacific, with some species in Africa.

Eastern olivaceous warbler, Iduna pallidaOlive-tree warbler, Hippolais olivetorumMelodious warbler, Hippolais polyglotta (A)
Icterine warbler, Hippolais icterinaAquatic warbler, Acrocephalus paludicolaMoustached warbler, Acrocephalus melanopogonSedge warbler, Acrocephalus schoenobaenusMarsh warbler, Acrocephalus palustrisEurasian reed warbler, Acrocephalus scirpaceusGreat reed warbler, Acrocephalus arundinaceusGrassbirds and allies
Order: PasseriformesFamily: Locustellidae

Locustellidae are a family of small insectivorous songbirds found mainly in Eurasia, Africa, and the Australian region. They are smallish birds with tails that are usually long and pointed, and tend to be drab brownish or buffy all over.

River warbler, Locustella fluviatilisSavi's warbler, Locustella luscinioidesCommon grasshopper-warbler, Locustella naeviaSwallows
Order: PasseriformesFamily: Hirundinidae

The family Hirundinidae is adapted to aerial feeding. They have a slender streamlined body, long pointed wings and a short bill with a wide gape. The feet are adapted to perching rather than walking, and the front toes are partially joined at the base.

Bank swallow, Riparia ripariaEurasian crag-martin, Ptyonoprogne rupestrisBarn swallow, Hirundo rusticaRed-rumped swallow, Cecropis dauricaCommon house-martin, Delichon urbicumLeaf warblers
Order: PasseriformesFamily: Phylloscopidae

Leaf warblers are a family of small insectivorous birds found mostly in Eurasia and ranging into Wallacea and Africa. The species are of various sizes, often green-plumaged above and yellow below, or more subdued with greyish-green to greyish-brown colours.

Wood warbler, Phylloscopus sibilatrixWestern Bonelli's warbler, Phylloscopus bonelliEastern Bonelli's warbler, Phylloscopus orientalisYellow-browed warbler, Phylloscopus inornatus (A)
Willow warbler, Phylloscopus trochilusCommon chiffchaff, Phylloscopus collybitaBush warblers and allies
Order: PasseriformesFamily: Scotocercidae

The members of this family are found throughout Africa, Asia, and Polynesia. Their taxonomy is in flux, and some authorities place some genera in other families.

Cetti's warbler, Cettia cettiLong-tailed tits
Order: PasseriformesFamily: Aegithalidae

Long-tailed tits are a group of small passerine birds with medium to long tails. They make woven bag nests in trees. Most eat a mixed diet which includes insects. 

Long-tailed tit, Aegithalos caudatusSylviid warblers, parrotbills, and allies
Order: PasseriformesFamily: Sylviidae

The family Sylviidae is a group of small insectivorous passerine birds. They mainly occur as breeding species, as the common name implies, in Europe, Asia and, to a lesser extent, Africa. Most are of generally undistinguished appearance, but many have distinctive songs.

Eurasian blackcap, Sylvia atricapillaGarden warbler, Sylvia borinBarred warbler, Curruca nisoriaLesser whitethroat, Curruca currucaEastern Orphean warbler, Curruca crassirostrisWestern subalpine warbler, Curruca iberiae (A)
Eastern subalpine warbler, Curruca cantillansSardinian warbler, Curruca melanocephalaGreater whitethroat, Curruca communisKinglets
Order: PasseriformesFamily: Regulidae

The kinglets, also called crests, are a small group of birds often included in the Old World warblers, but frequently given family status because they also resemble the titmice. 

Goldcrest, Regulus regulusCommon firecrest, Regulus ignicapillaWallcreeper
Order: PasseriformesFamily: Tichodromidae

The wallcreeper is a small bird related to the nuthatch family, which has stunning crimson, grey and black plumage.

Wallcreeper, Tichodroma murariaNuthatches
Order: PasseriformesFamily: Sittidae

Nuthatches are small woodland birds. They have the unusual ability to climb down trees head first, unlike other birds which can only go upwards. Nuthatches have big heads, short tails and powerful bills and feet. 

Eurasian nuthatch, Sitta europaeaWestern rock nuthatch, Sitta neumayerTreecreepers
Order: PasseriformesFamily: Certhiidae

Treecreepers are small woodland birds, brown above and white below. They have thin pointed down-curved bills, which they use to extricate insects from bark. They have stiff tail feathers, like woodpeckers, which they use to support themselves on vertical trees. 

Eurasian treecreeper, Certhia familiarisShort-toed treecreeper, Certhia brachydactylaWrens
Order: PasseriformesFamily: Troglodytidae

The wrens are mainly small and inconspicuous except for their loud songs. These birds have short wings and thin down-turned bills. Several species often hold their tails upright. All are insectivorous.

Eurasian wren, Troglodytes troglodytesDippers
Order: PasseriformesFamily: Cinclidae

Dippers are a group of perching birds whose habitat includes aquatic environments in the Americas, Europe and Asia. They are named for their bobbing or dipping movements. 

White-throated dipper, Cinclus cinclusStarlings
Order: PasseriformesFamily: Sturnidae

Starlings are small to medium-sized passerine birds. Their flight is strong and direct and they are very gregarious. Their preferred habitat is fairly open country. They eat insects and fruit. Plumage is typically dark with a metallic sheen. 

European starling, Sturnus vulgarisRosy starling, Pastor roseusThrushes and allies
Order: PasseriformesFamily: Turdidae

The thrushes are a group of passerine birds that occur mainly in the Old World. They are plump, soft plumaged, small to medium-sized insectivores or sometimes omnivores, often feeding on the ground. Many have attractive songs.

Mistle thrush, Turdus viscivorusSong thrush, Turdus philomelosRedwing, Turdus iliacusEurasian blackbird, Turdus merulaFieldfare, Turdus pilarisRing ouzel, Turdus torquatusOld World flycatchers
Order: PasseriformesFamily: Muscicapidae

Old World flycatchers are a large group of small passerine birds native to the Old World. They are mainly small arboreal insectivores. The appearance of these birds is highly varied, but they mostly have weak songs and harsh calls.

Spotted flycatcher, Muscicapa striataRufous-tailed scrub-robin, Cercotrichas galactotesEuropean robin, Erithacus rubeculaCommon nightingale, Luscinia megarhynchosBluethroat, Luscinia svecicaRed-breasted flycatcher, Ficedula parvaEuropean pied flycatcher, Ficedula hypoleucaCollared flycatcher, Ficedula albicollisCommon redstart, Phoenicurus phoenicurusBlack redstart, Phoenicurus ochrurosRufous-tailed rock-thrush, Monticola saxatilisBlue rock-thrush, Monticola solitariusWhinchat, Saxicola rubetraEuropean stonechat, Saxicola rubicolaNorthern wheatear, Oenanthe oenantheWestern black-eared wheatear, Oenanthe hispanicaEastern black-eared wheatear, Oenanthe melanoleucaWaxwings
Order: PasseriformesFamily: Bombycillidae

The waxwings are a group of passerine birds with soft silky plumage and unique red tips to some of the wing feathers. In the Bohemian and cedar waxwings, these tips look like sealing wax and give the group its name. These are arboreal birds of northern forests. They live on insects in summer and berries in winter.

Bohemian waxwing, Bombycilla garrulusAccentors
Order: PasseriformesFamily: Prunellidae

The accentors are in the only bird family, Prunellidae, which is completely endemic to the Palearctic. They are small, fairly drab species superficially similar to sparrows.

Alpine accentor, Prunella collarisDunnock, Prunella modularisOld World sparrows
Order: PasseriformesFamily: Passeridae

Old World sparrows are small passerine birds. In general, sparrows tend to be small, plump, brown or grey birds with short tails and short powerful beaks. Sparrows are seed eaters, but they also consume small insects.

House sparrow, Passer domesticusSpanish sparrow, Passer hispaniolensisEurasian tree sparrow, Passer montanusWhite-winged snowfinch, Montifringilla nivalisWagtails and pipits
Order: PasseriformesFamily: Motacillidae

Motacillidae is a family of small passerine birds with medium to long tails. They include the wagtails, longclaws and pipits. They are slender, ground feeding insectivores of open country. 

Gray wagtail, Motacilla cinereaWestern yellow wagtail, Motacilla flavaCitrine wagtail, Motacilla citreolaWhite wagtail, Motacilla albaTawny pipit, Anthus campestrisMeadow pipit, Anthus pratensisTree pipit, Anthus trivialisRed-throated pipit, Anthus cervinusWater pipit, Anthus spinolettaFinches, euphonias, and allies
Order: PasseriformesFamily: Fringillidae

Finches are seed-eating passerine birds, that are small to moderately large and have a strong beak, usually conical and in some species very large. All have twelve tail feathers and nine primaries. These birds have a bouncing flight with alternating bouts of flapping and gliding on closed wings, and most sing well.

Common chaffinch, Fringilla coelebsBrambling, Fringilla montifringillaHawfinch, Coccothraustes coccothraustesCommon rosefinch, Carpodacus erythrinusEurasian bullfinch, Pyrrhula pyrrhulaEuropean greenfinch, Chloris chlorisTwite, Linaria flavirostrisEurasian linnet, Linaria cannabinaLesser redpoll, Acanthis cabaretHoary redpoll, Acanthis hornemanni (A)
Red crossbill, Loxia curvirostraEuropean goldfinch, Carduelis carduelisEuropean serin, Serinus serinusEurasian siskin, Spinus spinusLongspurs and snow buntings
Order: PasseriformesFamily: Calcariidae

The Calcariidae are a family of birds that had been traditionally grouped with the New World sparrows, but differ in a number of respects and are usually found in open grassy areas.

Lapland longspur, Calcarius lapponicusSnow bunting, Plectrophenax nivalisOld World buntings
Order: PasseriformesFamily: Emberizidae

The emberizids are a large family of passerine birds. They are seed-eating birds with distinctively shaped bills. Many emberizid species have distinctive head patterns.

Black-headed bunting, Emberiza melanocephalaCorn bunting, Emberiza calandraRock bunting, Emberiza ciaCirl bunting, Emberiza cirlusYellowhammer, Emberiza citrinellaOrtolan bunting, Emberiza hortulanaReed bunting, Emberiza schoeniclusLittle bunting, Emberiza pusilla'' (A)

See also
List of birds
Lists of birds by region

References

Lists of birds by country
Lists of birds of Europe
Birds
Birds